White Woman is a 1933 film by Stuart Walker.

White Woman or White Women may also refer to:
 White Women (album), a 2014 album by Chromeo
 White Women, a 1997 album by William Carlos Williams
 "White Women", a 1976 song by Sparks from Big Beat
 "White Women", a 1984 song by Jonas Hellborg from Elegant Punk
 "White Women", a 2006 song by Adam Green from Jacket Full of Danger
 "White Women", a 2012 song by Caustic from I Can't Believe We're Re-Releasing This Crap
 White Women, a 1976 book by Helmut Newton
 Missing white woman syndrome

See also
 Iztaccihuatl, a Mexican mountain whose name translates to "white woman"
 Dames blanches ("White Ladies"), spirits in French mythology or folklore
 Weiße Frauen ("White Women"), spirits in German folklore
 White woman of Gippsland, a supposed European woman held captive by Aboriginal Australians in the 1840s
 Lady in White (disambiguation)
 White Lady (disambiguation)
 The Woman in White (disambiguation)
 Dame Blanche (disambiguation)
 White people (disambiguation)